Aanchal is a 1980 Hindi film directed by Anil Ganguly, starring Rajesh Khanna, Raakhee and Rekha in leading roles and supported by Prem Chopra and Amol Palekar. This story basically revolves around a divine relationship shared by Rajesh Khanna with Raakhee. The music is by R. D. Burman. The songs are sung by Kishore Kumar, Lata Mangehkar and Asha Bhonsle. The movie is loosely based on the 1954 Bengali movie Champadangar Bou.

Plot
It is the story of an Indian woman, as pure as Sita, who is tested by a series of family events and problems. The story revolves around the relationship between Shambu  (Rajesh) and his sister-in-law Shanti (Raakhee). People in the village start speculating whether Shambu is romantically involved with Shanti, and even Kishan starts doubting his brother's intentions. Tulsi who loves Shambu, too, starts thinking bad about Shambu.

Cast
Rajesh Khanna as Shambu
Raakhee as Shanti
Rekha as Tulsi
Prem Chopra as Jaggan Prasad
Amol Palekar as Kishan Lal
 Jankidas as man who disrupts the Ramleela drama
 Leela Mishra as Ishwarya
 Birbal as 'Sugreev' in drama and Murali barber
 Master Ravi as Kaluwa
 Master Sandeep as Chedi
 Asit Sen as Govt survey officer
 Amol Sen as Farmer selling cows to Kishan
 Abhi Bhattacharya as Ramleela Drama singer
 Dinesh Hingoo as Mutthu, Jaggan's driver
 Viju Khote as Jaggan's henchman
 Shammi as Chachi
 Ranjana Sachdev as Kaluwa's mother
 Sarita Devi as Jaggan's mother

Music
Songs for Khanna are sung by Kishore Kumar, for Raakhee by Lata Mangehkar and for Rekha by Asha Bhonsle. Songs were written by Majrooh Sultanpuri.
"Bas Meri Jaa" – Kishore Kumar, Lata Mangeshkar
"Aisa Rangeen Sama" – Kishore Kumar
"Paise Ka Kajal" – Kishore Kumar, Asha Bhonsle
"Lanka Chale Ramji" – Kishore Kumar, Sapan Chakraborty
"Bhor Bhaye Panchi" – Lata Mangeshkar
"Jane De Gaadi Teri" – Asha Bhonsle

References

External links

Films scored by R. D. Burman
1980 films
Indian family films
Indian drama films
1980s Hindi-language films
Films directed by Anil Ganguly
Hindi-language drama films
Films based on works by Tarasankar Bandyopadhyay